Tetiana Beliaieva (born 2 October 1971) is a Ukrainian judoka. She competed at the 1996 Summer Olympics and the 2000 Summer Olympics.

References

1971 births
Living people
Ukrainian female judoka
Olympic judoka of Ukraine
Judoka at the 1996 Summer Olympics
Judoka at the 2000 Summer Olympics
Place of birth missing (living people)